Rasan or Resan may refer to:
 Rasan (organization), a Kurdish freedom fighters and women's rights organization
 Rasan, Khuzestan, a village in Iran
 Rasan, Razavi Khorasan, a village in Iran
Kalateh-ye Allah Resan, a village in Iran
Resan Hanım (1860–1910), wife of Sultan Murad V of the Ottoman Empire